UPC Sweden was a Swedish cable television distributor, mainly active in the Stockholm region. It was the second largest cable network in Sweden before it was integrated into Com Hem in 2006.

It was formed in 1985 by the three estate companies Familjebostäder, Svenska Bostäder and Stockholmshem as StjärnTV. It was later sold to Singapore Telecom International, who passed it on to Scandinavian Equity Partners in 1998. They, now known as EQT Scandinavia, sold it to United Pan-Europe Communications in 1999 who changed the company name to UPC in 2000. Digital television was launched in 2001, but it kept an analogue basic package for its entire existence.

In April 2006, Liberty Global Europe (formerly UPC) decided to sell many of their assets, including UPC Sweden and UPC Norway. The Swedish part was sold to Carlyle Group and Providence Equity Partners, two American equity firms that also owned Com Hem, the largest cable company in Sweden. The UPC brand was replaced by the Com Hem brand in November and the cable network was technically integrated in April 2007.

Cable television companies
Television in Sweden